The following page lists power stations in Italy.

List of largest power stations

This is a list of power stations in Italy with a capacity greater than 100 MW.

Other power stations by source

Geothermal (<100 MW)

Hydroelectric (<100 MW)

This is a list of hydroelectric power plants in Italy with a capacity between 10MW and 100MW.

Nuclear 

There are no active nuclear power stations in Italy.

Solar PV

Source:

Wind

See also 

 Lists of power stations
 List of largest power stations

References 

Italy
 
Lists of buildings and structures in Italy